PAH or Pah may refer to:

Science and technology

Chemistry 
 Polycyclic aromatic hydrocarbon, one of a class of chemical compounds, organic pollutants
 PAH world hypothesis, hypothesis that proposes that the use of polycyclic aromatic hydrocarbons was a means for the origin of life
 Polyallylamine hydrochloride, a polyelectrolyte used in polymer sheets
 Polyanhydrides, a class of biodegradable polymers

Medicine 
 Para-aminohippurate, a substance used in the measurement of blood flow in the kidneys
 PAH clearance, Para-aminohippuric acid clearance, a measurement of renal plasma flow
 Paradoxical adipose hyperplasia, a potential complication of cryolipolysis
 Phenylalanine hydroxylase, an enzyme involved in breaking down phenylalanine
 Primary alveolar hypoventilation, a condition of inadequate air movement in the lungs
 Pulmonary arterial hypertension, a condition of elevated blood pressure in the pulmonary artery

Organizations
 Plataforma de Afectados por la Hipoteca, a Spanish housing rights organization
 Polish Humanitarian Action, a Polish non-governmental organisation (Polish: Polska Akcja Humanitarna)
 Russian Academy of Sciences, Russian: Российская Академия Наук (РАН)

People 
 Pah Wongso, born Victor Wijnhamer, Jr., (Chinese: 伯王梭; pinyin: Bó Wángsuō), an Indo social worker

Places 
 Pan-American Highway
 Pah, Gujarat, a village and former non-salute Rajput princely state in Gujarat, INdia
 Pah Homestead, a historic home in Hillsborough, Auckland, New Zealand
 Barkley Regional Airport, Paducah, Kentucky, U.S., IATA airport code PAH
 Pah-Ute County, Arizona Territory

Other 
 Pah, the lunar deity in Pawnee mythology
 Pah Wraith, in the fictional Star Trek universe